Bob LeVitus (also known as Dr. Mac) is an American author of more than 75 computer-related books, particularly on the Apple Macintosh, iPhone, and iPad for the book series ...For Dummies. He has been a columnist for the Houston Chronicle since 1996 and a columnist for The Mac Observer since 2001. His latest project is Working Smarter for Mac Users, a blog and ebook about personal productivity.

External links 
Working Smarter for Mac Users (dot com)

American technology writers
Living people
Year of birth missing (living people)